South Western Sydney is a region of the metropolitan area in southwest Sydney, New South Wales, Australia. It is part of the predominantly working class area of Greater Western Sydney. The region lies in the Cumberland Plain.

Local government areas
There are a number of different boundaries for the region. Sometimes it includes only the areas around Liverpool, Canterbury-Bankstown and Campbelltown. Increasingly, it has also included Macarthur region (the local government areas of Camden Council and Wollondilly Shire).  It may also include the whole area from the inner south-west suburbs around Canterbury and Bankstown to the outer south-west suburbs around Campbelltown and beyond to Camden.

In this second, broader sense, South-western Sydney is the suburbs found in the local government areas of the City of Canterbury-Bankstown, City of Fairfield, City of Liverpool, City of Campbelltown, Camden Council, and Wollondilly Shire Council.

Institutions 
Several institutions have 'South Western Sydney' in their title, including: 
  South Western Sydney Local Health District 
  South Western Sydney Institute 
  South Western Sydney Clinical School

See also 
 Southern Sydney
 St George Area
 Greater Western Sydney
 Macarthur Region
 Regions of Sydney
 Western Sydney
 Geography of Sydney

References 

 
Regions of Sydney
Hume Highway
Georges River